Noah Gregor (born July 28, 1998) is a Canadian professional ice hockey player for the San Jose Sharks of the National Hockey League (NHL).

Early life
Gregor was born on July 28, 1998, in Beaumont, Alberta to parents Colin and Elise. He was born into a hockey-involved family as his father played four seasons in the Western Hockey League while his uncle is a radio host for The Sports Network. Likewise, his brother Liam played hockey with the Beaumont Chiefs and Spruce Grove Saints.

Playing career
Growing up in Beaumont, Alberta, Gregor played in the Beaumont Minor Hockey Association and Albert Midget Hockey League (AMHL). While playing with the Leduc Oil Kings Bantam in the 2013–14 season, Gregor led the AMHL with 21 goals and 30 points through 35 games. As a result of his play with the Oil Kings, Gregor was selected 55th overall by the Victoria Royals in the 2013 WHL Bantam Draft, the same franchise for whom his father played. However, Gregor was traded to the Moose Jaw Warriors in January 2014 in exchange for Travis Brown. Upon joining the Warriors, Gregor played four preseason games on their top line alongside Brayden Point and Jack Rodewald. He recorded six points through his first eight regular-season games before breaking his collarbone and derailing his season. Gregor spent two months rehabbing and preparing to return but he reaggravated the injury after returning and missed the remainder of the season to recover.

Gregor returned to the Warriors for the 2015–16 season and scored a goal in their preseason games. Once the regular season began, Gregor began producing at a similar rate to his previous season. In November 2015, Gregor scored a goal and three assists to help lead the Warriors to a 7–4 win over the Saskatoon Blades. This continued throughout the season and he quickly ranked third in rookie scoring with 20 goals and 43 points through 48 games. As such, he was chosen to represent Team Cherry in the CHL/NHL Top Prospects Game. Gregor finished the season with 28 goals and 73 points to earn the teams' Most Sportsmanlike Player and Rookie of the Year Award. He also accepted the Eastern Conference Rookie of the Year Award. Gregor also helped the Warriors qualify for the 2016 WHL Playoffs where he tallied three goals and nine points through 15 games. Following his rookie campaign, Gregor was drafted 111th overall by the San Jose Sharks in the 2016 NHL Entry Draft. He then attended the Sharks' training camp but returned to the Warriors for the 2016–17 WHL season. Upon rejoining the team, Gregor was named an alternate captain alongside Tanner Jeannot and Josh Thrower. 

He played with the Warriors until December 2017 when he was returned to the Victoria Royals. At the time of the trade, Gregor had recorded 14 goals and 22 assists through 30 games to help the Warriors maintain first place in the league. Upon rejoining the Royals, Gregor recorded 29 points through 30 regular-season games and contributed 12 points in 11 playoff contests. Following the conclusion of the 2017–18 season, Gregor was traded to the Prince Albert Raiders in exchange for conditional compensation.

Professional
He signed an entry level contract with the Sharks on April 6, 2018 and played his first NHL game against the Buffalo Sabres on October 19, 2019. He was re-signed from the Sharks on September 13, 2021. On August 22, 2022, he was re-signed by the Sharks to a one-year deal.

Career statistics

Regular season and playoffs

International

References

External links

1998 births
Living people
Canadian ice hockey centres
Canadian expatriate ice hockey players in the United States
Ice hockey people from Alberta
Moose Jaw Warriors players
Prince Albert Raiders players
San Jose Barracuda players
San Jose Sharks draft picks
San Jose Sharks players
Victoria Royals players